is a Japanese author of mystery fiction, best known for his Hitman novel/manga series, including Maoh: Juvenile Remix (2007–2009), the first of which, 3 Assassins (2004, Japanese; 2022, English), was adapted as a Japanese feature film, Grasshopper (2015), and the second of which, Maria Beetle (2010, Japanese; 2021, English), was adapted as an American feature film, Bullet Train (2022).

Life and career 
Isaka was born in Matsudo City, Chiba Prefecture, Japan. After graduating from the law faculty of Tohoku University, he worked as a system engineer. In 2000, Isaka won the Shincho Mystery Club Prize for his debut novel Ōdyubon no Inori, after which he became a full-time writer.

In 2002, Isaka's novel Lush Life gained much critical acclaim, but it was his Naoki Prize-nominated work Jūryoku Piero (2003) that brought him popular success. His following work Ahiru to Kamo no Koin Rokkā won the 25th Yoshikawa Eiji Prize for New Writers.

Jūryoku Piero (2003), Children (2004), Grasshopper (2004), Shinigami no Seido (2005) and Sabaku (2006) were all nominated for the Naoki Prize.

Isaka was the only author in Japan to be nominated for the Hon'ya Taishō in each of the award's first four years, finally winning in 2008 with Remote Control (original Japanese title: Golden Slumber). The same work also won the 21st Yamamoto Shūgorō Prize.

Isaka's books have sold millions of copies around the world.

His 2010 novel Maria Beetle was adapted as the 2022 major film Bullet Train starring Brad Pitt.

A film adaptation of his 2019 book Seesaw Monster (Shisō Monsutā, シーソーモンスター), starring Anne Hathaway and Salma Hayek (who are also producers), is currently in production and will be distributed by Netflix.

Works available in English 
 Novels
 Remote Control (original Japanese title: Golden Slumber), trans. Stephen Snyder (Kodansha USA, 2011) 
 Hitman series
  (original Japanese title: Grasshopper), trans. Sam Malissa (Japan 2004; Harvill Secker and The Overlook Press, 2022)  
 Bullet Train (original Japanese title: Maria Beetle), trans. Sam Malissa (Japan 2010; Harvill Secker and The Overlook Press, 2021)  

 Manga
 Hitman series
  (Japan 2007–2009; Viz Media, 2010–2012) 
 Waltz (Japan 2009–2012; Viz Media 2010–2012)

Short stories
 The Precision of the Agent of Death (original Japanese title: Shinigami no Seido), trans. Beth Cary
 Ellery Queen's Mystery Magazine, July 2006
 Passport to Crime: Finest Mystery Stories from International Crime Writers, Running Press, 2007 
 The Bookmobile (original Japanese title: Bukkumobīru), trans. Michael Emmerich (Granta online, 4 November 2020)

Awards 
 2022 – Strand Critics Awards for Best Debut Novel: Bullet Train (original Japanese title: Maria Beetle)

 Japanese awards
 1996 – 13th Suntory Mystery Prize honorable mention: Akutō Tachi ga Me ni Shimiru (Later revised as Yōkina Gyangu ga Chikyū o Mawasu)
 2000 – 5th Shincho Mystery Club Prize: Ōdyubon no Inori
 2004 – 25th Yoshikawa Eiji Prize for New Writers: Ahiru to Kamo no Koin Rokkā
 2004 – 57th Mystery Writers of Japan Award for Best Short Story: Shinigami no Seido
 2008 – 5th Japan Booksellers' Award (Hon'ya Taishō): Remote Control (original Japanese title: Golden Slumber)
 2008 – 21st Yamamoto Shūgorō Prize: Remote Control (original Japanese title: Golden Slumber)
 2020 – 33rd Shibata Renzaburō Award: Gyaku Sokuratesu

 French awards
 2012 – Prix Masterton (fr): Ōdyubon no Inori (French title: La Prière d'Audubon)
 2012 – Prix Zoom Japon: Ōdyubon no Inori (French title: La Prière d'Audubon)

Bibliography

Hitman series

 , 2004 novel
 , 2005 short story collection
 , 2007–2009 manga series
 , 2009–2012 manga series
 , 2010 novel
 , 2017 short story collection

Other novels
 , 2000 (French translation: La Prière d'Audubon, Philippe Picquier Publishing, 2011)
 , 2002
 , 2003
 , 2003 (French translation: Pierrot-la-gravité, Philippe Picquier Publishing, 2012)
 , 2003
 , 2005
 , 2006
 , 2007
 , 2008
 , 2009
 , 2009
 , 2010
 , 2012
 , 2013
 , 2013
 , co-authored with Kazushige Abe, 2014
 , 2015
 , 2015
 , 2016
 , 2017
 , 2018
 , 2019
 , 2021

Short story collections
 , 2004
 , 2005 (French translation: La Mort avec précision, Philippe Picquier Publishing, 2015)
 , 2006
 , 2007
 , 2010
 , 2012
 , 2012
 , 2014
 , 2014
 , 2015
 , 2019
 , 2020
 , 2022

Film adaptations
 A Cheerful Gang Turns the Earth (2006) (Yōkina Gyangu ga Chikyū o Mawasu)
 Children (2006)
 The Foreign Duck, the Native Duck and God in a Coin Locker (2007) (Ahiru to Kamo no Koin Rokkā)
 Sweet Rain (2008)  (Shinigami no Seido)
 Fish Story (2009)
 Gravity's Clowns (2009) (Jūryoku Piero)
 Lush Life (2009)
 Golden Slumber (2010)
 Chips (2012) (Potechi)
 Oh! Father (2014)
Grasshopper (2015)
 Golden Slumber (2018) (Korean movie)
 Little Nights, Little Love (2019) (Eine kleine Nachtmusik)
 Bullet Train (2022) (Maria beetle)
 Untitled Seesaw Monster film adaptation (TBA)

Manga adaptations
 Grasshopper (3 Assassins)
 Eine kleine Nachtmusik

References

External links 
  Official Website

Japanese writers
Japanese crime fiction writers
Mystery Writers of Japan Award winners
Writers from Chiba Prefecture
1971 births
Living people
Tohoku University alumni
Hitman (novel series)